Westerbork may refer to:

Places
 Westerbork (village), a village in the Netherlands
 Westerbork transit camp, a Nazi transit camp near Westerbork

Other uses
 Westerbork Synthesis Radio Telescope, an aperture synthesis interferometer near Westerbork